The Messier objects are a set of 110 astronomical objects catalogued by the French astronomer Charles Messier in his  (Catalogue of Nebulae and Star Clusters). 
Because Messier was only interested in finding comets, he created a list of those non-comet objects that frustrated his hunt for them. The compilation of this list, in collaboration with his assistant Pierre Méchain, is known as the Messier catalogue. This catalogue of objects is one of the most famous lists of astronomical objects, and many Messier objects are still referenced by their Messier numbers. 
The catalogue includes most of the astronomical deep-sky objects that can easily be observed from Earth's Northern Hemisphere; many Messier objects are popular targets for amateur astronomers.

A preliminary version first appeared in 1774 in the Memoirs of the French Academy of Sciences for the year 1771.
The first version of Messier's catalogue contained 45 objects which were not yet numbered. Eighteen of the objects were discovered by Messier, the rest being previously observed by other astronomers.
By 1780 the catalogue had increased to 70 objects. The final version of the catalogue containing 103 objects was published in 1781 in the Connaissance des Temps for the year 1784.
However, due to what was thought for a long time to be the incorrect addition of Messier 102, the total number remained 102. Other astronomers, using side notes in Messier's texts, eventually filled out the list up to 110 objects.

The catalogue consists of a diverse range of astronomical objects, from star clusters and nebulae to galaxies. For example, Messier 1 is a supernova remnant, known as the Crab Nebula, and the great spiral Andromeda Galaxy is M31. Further inclusions followed, the first addition came from Nicolas Camille Flammarion in 1921, who added Messier 104 after finding Messier's side note in his 1781 edition exemplar of the catalogue. M105 to M107 were added by Helen Sawyer Hogg in 1947, M108 and M109 by Owen Gingerich in 1960, and M110 by Kenneth Glyn Jones in 1967.

Lists and editions

The first edition of 1774 covered 45 objects (M1 to M45). The total list published by Messier in 1781 contained 103 objects, but the list was expanded through successive additions by other astronomers, motivated by notes in Messier's and Méchain's texts indicating that at least one of them knew of the additional objects. The first such addition came from Nicolas Camille Flammarion in 1921, who added Messier 104 after finding a note Messier made in a copy of the 1781 edition of the catalogue. M105 to M107 were added by Helen Sawyer Hogg in 1947, M108 and M109 by Owen Gingerich in 1960, and M110 by Kenneth Glyn Jones in 1967. M102 was observed by Méchain, who communicated his notes to Messier. Méchain later concluded that this object was simply a re-observation of M101, though some sources suggest that the object Méchain observed was the galaxy NGC 5866 and identify that as M102.

Messier's final catalogue was included in the  [Knowledge of the Times for the Year 1784], the French official yearly publication of astronomical ephemerides.

Messier lived and did his astronomical work at the Hôtel de Cluny (now the Musée national du Moyen Âge), in Paris, France.  The list he compiled contains only objects found in the sky area he could observe: from the north celestial pole to a celestial latitude of about −35.7° . He did not observe or list objects visible only from farther south, such as the Large and Small Magellanic Clouds.

Observations
The Messier catalogue comprises nearly all of the most spectacular examples of the five types of deep-sky object – diffuse nebulae, planetary nebulae, open clusters, globular clusters, and galaxies – visible from European latitudes. Furthermore, almost all of the Messier objects are among the closest to Earth in their respective classes, which makes them heavily studied with professional class instruments that today can resolve very small and visually significant details in them. A summary of the astrophysics of each Messier object can be found in the Concise Catalog of Deep-sky Objects.

Since these objects could be observed visually with the relatively small-aperture refracting telescope (approximately 100 mm ≈ 4 inches) used by Messier to study the sky, they are among the brightest and thus most attractive astronomical objects (popularly called deep-sky objects) observable from Earth, and are popular targets for visual study and astrophotography available to modern amateur astronomers using larger aperture equipment. In early spring, astronomers sometimes gather for "Messier marathons", when all of the objects can be viewed over a single night.

Messier objects

Star chart of Messier objects

See also
Lists of astronomical objects
Caldwell catalogue
Deep-sky object
Herschel 400 Catalogue
New General Catalogue

References

External links
  — includes images
 
 
 
 

 
Astronomical catalogues
1771 in science
Messier